Fire It Up is a 1997 Blues album by Tinsley Ellis. It was recorded and mixed at Southern Tracks 
Atlanta, Georgia by Caram Costanzo with Ryan Williams as assistant engineer, mastered by Jason Rau and produced by 
Tom Dowd. Tinsley wrote or co-wrote five of the songs.

Track listing
 "Diggin' My Own Grave"
 "Just Dropped In"
 "Standing on the Edge of Love"
 "Soulful"
 "Are You Sorry?"
 "I Walk Alone"
 "Change Your Mind"
 "Break My Rule"
 "One Sunny Day"
 "If That's How He Loves You"
 "Look What You Done"
 "Everyday"

Musicians
Tinsley Ellis on Guitar and vocals
Donald Dunn and Scott Koziol on Bass guitar  
Rob McNeely on guitar 
Tad Parker, Scott Meeder and Kennard Johnson on drums 
Kevin McKendree on keyboards

References

Allmusic "Fire It Up

External links
Tinsley Ellis website

1997 albums
Tinsley Ellis albums